Pirarajá is a village in the Lavalleja Department of southeastern Uruguay.

Geography
It is located on Route 8 and on its junction with Route 58, about 

History
Its status was elevated to "Pueblo" (village) on 22 December 1906 by decree Ley Nº 3.136.

Population
In 2011 Pirarajá had a population of 713.
 
Source: Instituto Nacional de Estadística de Uruguay

References

External links
INE map of Pirarajá

Populated places in the Lavalleja Department